Lilith is a character in Jewish mythology.

Lilith, Lilit, Lilitu, or Lilis may also refer to:
 Lilith (Lurianic Kabbalah)

Literature
 Lilith (magazine), a Jewish feminist magazine
 Lilith (novel), an 1895 gothic novel by George MacDonald

Characters
 Lilith (Marvel Comics), two characters in the Marvel Comics universe
 Lilith Clay, a superheroine in the DC Comics universe
 Lilith Clay, also known as Judy, from the Girl Genius comic/webcomic
 Lilith, the title character in the Lilith's Brood science-fiction trilogy by Octavia E. Butler
 Lilith, a character in Trinity Blood
 Lilith, a character in Yami to Bōshi to Hon no Tabibito
 Lilith, a character in Tales from the Crypt Presents: Bordello of Blood
 Lilith, a villain in the Nightside series by S. Green
 Lilith, a demon in the City of Fallen Angels
 Lilith, a character in Sinfest
 Lilith Weatherwax, a character in  ‘‘Witches Abroad’‘
 Dr. Lilith Ritter, a character in Nightmare Alley
 Lilith, a character in the play She Kills Monsters by Qui Nguyen

Music
 Lilith (album), a 2017 album by Butcher Babies
 Lilith (opera), a 2001 opera by Deborah Drattell
 "Lilith", a song by Chelsea Grin from Evolve
 "Lilith", a song by Halsey from If I Can't Have Love, I Want Power
 "Lilith", a song by Therion from Les Fleurs du Mal
 "Lilith/Eve", a song by Machines of Loving Grace from Concentration
 Lilith, a dark ambient music project of Scott Gibbons

Film and television
Film
 Lilith (film), a 1964 film set in an asylum based on a novel by the same name by J. R. Salamanca
Television
 Lilith (Supernatural), a fictional demon in Supernatural
 Lilith, a villain in Doctor Who
 Lilith, the host of the TV series Femme Fatales
 Lilith, the vampire Goddess in season five of True Blood
 Lilith, a demon referred to as the mother of all demons who is the main villain in season 3 of Shadowhunters
 Lilith, also known as Madam Satan, in Chilling Adventures of Sabrina (2018–2020)
 Lilith, a demon in episode 4 of season 5 of Lucifer
 Lilith Clawthorne, a character from the animated fantasy series The Owl House
 Lilith Hughes, mother of Cassie Hughes in the Sky One series Hex
 Lilith Sternin, on Cheers and Frasier

Anime
 Lilith (Neon Genesis Evangelion), an angel in Neon Genesis Evangelion
 Lilith, a small fairy in the Rosario + Vampire manga and anime series
 Lilith Aensland, a character in Darkstalkers anime
 Lilith Aileron, in Tales of Destiny anime
 Lilith Asami, in Trinity Seven anime

Games
 Lilith (World of Darkness), mother of all demons in the World of Darkness series of games
 Lilith (Dungeons & Dragons), a consort she-devil in Dungeons & Dragons
 Lilith, a succubus in Darkstalkers
 Lilith, a Siren in the Borderlands series
 Lilith, a character in Darksiders II
 Lilith, a character in Devil May Cry
 Lilith, a character in The Secret World
 Lilith, the "Mother of Monsters," a playable master in Malifaux
 Lilith, a character in The Binding of Isaac: Afterbirth
 Lilith, an Astral Dragon character from Fire Emblem Fates

Other uses
1181 Lilith, an asteroid
Lilith (computer), a computer designed in the late 1970s by Niklaus Wirth at ETH Zürich
Lilith (hypothetical moon), a moon from astrology
Lilith (painting), an 1889 painting by John Collier

People with the given name
 Lilit Hovhannisyan (born 1987), Armenian pop singer
 Lilith Nagar or Layla Najar (born 1935), Israeli television host, actress and singer
 Lilit Mkrtchian (born 1982), Armenian chess player
 Lilit Pipoyan (born 1955), Armenian musician

See also
 Lilith in popular culture
 Lady Lilith, a painting by Dante Rossetti
 Lilith Fair, an annual concert tour from 1997 to 1999
 The Lilith Project, by David deFeis from the heavy metal band Virgin Steele